Fieraru and Fierarul are Romanian-language surname of occupational derivation, meaning "blacksmith" ('-ul' corresponds to a definite article). Notable people with the surname include:

Alfred Fieraru,  Romanian football player and figure skater
Gheorghe Fieraru, Romanian Olympic volleyball player (1964 men's team)

See also
 Fierarul River (disambiguation)
 Fieru River (disambiguation)

References

Romanian-language surnames